Miracles for Beginners is the sixth studio album from UK singer-songwriter Nick Harper.

Track listing
 "Miracles for Beginners"
 "Blue Sky Thinking"
 "The Field of a Cloth of Gold"
 "Magic Feather"
 "Evo"
 "2 Secs"
 "Always"
 "Your Love Has Saved Me from Myself"
 "Communication"
 "Simple"

References

External links
Official album page

2007 albums
Nick Harper albums